Parmenter is a surname. Notable people with the surname include:

Amy Parmenter (born 1997), Australian netball player
Carolyn Parmenter, fictional character in the Marvel Universe
Christine Whiting Parmenter (1877–1953), American author
Dennis Parmenter (1950–2020), Illinois politician
Doug Parmenter (born 1987), British musician
Ezra Parmenter (1823–1873), Massachusetts politician
Ian Parmenter, Australian celebrity chef, winemaker and author
Michael Parmenter (born 1954), New Zealand choreographer and dancer
Ross Parmenter (1912–1999), Canadian music critic, editor and author
Roswell A. Parmenter (1821–1904), New York politician
Steve Parmenter (born 1977), English association football player
Terry Parmenter (born 1947), English association football player
William Parmenter (1789–1866), US Representative from Massachusetts